The year 1816 in architecture involved some significant architectural events and new buildings.

Events
 February – Carl Ludvig Engel is appointed architect for the reconstruction of Helsinki.
 In Paris, the Académie royale d'architecture merges with the Académie de peinture et de sculpture (the French Academy) to become the École Nationale Supérieure des Beaux-Arts, the French National School of Fine Arts.

Buildings and structures

Buildings

 First Church of Christ, Lancaster, Massachusetts, designed by Charles Bulfinch, is built.
 First Unitarian Church of Providence in Providence, Rhode Island, designed by John Holden Greene, is completed.
 Karlsruhe Stadtkirche (Baden), designed by Friedrich Weinbrenner, is completed.
 Greater Church of the Ascension in Moscow, attributed to Matvey Kazakov or Ivan Starov, is completed.
 Stone Church of the Intercession of the Most Holy Mother of God in Khanty-Mansiysk, Russia, designed by Shangin, is completed about this date.
 Circular church of San Francesco di Paola (Naples) is completed.
 St Andrew's Church, Glasgow, Scotland (Roman Catholic), designed by James Gillespie Graham, is completed.
 Wellington Rooms, Liverpool, England, designed by Edmund Aikin, are completed.
 Fredericksburg Town Hall and Market Square in Virginia are completed.
 Lancaster County Lunatic Asylum in England, designed by Thomas Standen, is opened.
 South Wing of Sydney Hospital in Australia is completed.
 Berkshire County Courthouse, Lenox, Massachusetts, is completed.
 Théâtre des Funambules in Paris is built.
 Lord Hill's Column in Shrewsbury, England, designed by Edward Haycock, Sr. and Thomas Harrison, is completed.
 Tenantry Column in Alnwick, England, designed by David Stephenson, is erected.
 Vauxhall Bridge, originally known as Regent Bridge, crossing the River Thames in central London, designed by James Walker, is opened; it is replaced in 1895–1906.
 Richmond Bridge, crossing the River Liffey in Dublin, Ireland, designed by James Savage, is opened.
 The Ha'penny Bridge (Wellington Bridge), crossing the River Liffey in Dublin, Ireland, is erected.
 Spider Bridge at Falls of Schuylkill in Pennsylvania is erected by ironmakers Josiah White and Erskine Hazard, the first wire-cable suspension bridge in history.
 Design of Bahu Begum ka Maqbara in Faizabad, Uttar Pradesh by Darab Ali Khan.

Awards
 Grand Prix de Rome, architecture: Lucien Van Cleemputte.

Births
July 11 – Frans-Andries Durlet, Belgian architect and sculptor (died 1867)
August 9 – Patrick Keely, Irish-American architect based in Brooklyn (died 1896)
August 29 – Gridley James Fox Bryant, Boston architect and builder (died 1899)

Deaths
April 3 – Thomas Machin, English-born canal builder and military engineer in the United States (born 1744)

References

Architecture
Years in architecture
19th-century architecture